Several military leaders played a role in the American Revolutionary War. This is a compilation of some of the most important leaders among the many participants in the war. Militia: a part of the organized armed forces of a country liable to call only in emergency or a body of citizens organized for military service. In order to be listed here an individual must satisfy one of the following criteria:
 Was a nation's top civilian responsible for directing military affairs
 Held a commission of at least brigadier general or rear admiral in an organized military during the conflict
 Was the highest-ranking member of a given nation's force that participated in the conflict (if that rank was not at least major general)
 Was the highest-ranking member of a given state/colonial militia
 Was a provincial or territorial governor who is documented to have directed a military action
 Was a Native American tribal leader who had a documented leadership position in military action
Some individuals held concurrent positions in more than one organization, and a number of Continental Army generals also held high-ranking positions in their state militia organizations.

United States 

When the war began, because the American colonists feared a very strong armed force (also known as a "standing army"), each colony had traditionally provided its own defense through the use of local militia. Each of which had their own command hierarchy. Some states, most notably Pennsylvania and Massachusetts, also had their own navies.

Seeking to coordinate military efforts, the Continental Congress established (on paper) a regular army—the Continental Army—in June 1775, and appointed George Washington as commander-in-chief. The development of the Continental Army was always a work in progress, and Washington reluctantly augmented the regular troops with militia throughout the war.

General and Commander-in-chief

Continental Army

Major generals

Brigadier generals
John Armstrong Sr.
 George Clinton
 Elias Dayton
 Joseph Frye
 Christopher Gadsden
 John Glover
 Mordecai Gist
 John Greaton. Continental brigadier general from 7 January 1783 to 3 November 1783.
 John Philip De Haas. Continental brigadier general from 21 February 1777 to 3 November 1783.
 Moses Hazen
 James Hogun (North Carolina Line 1st Brigade)
 Isaac Huger
 Jedediah Huntington
 William Irvine
 Jean Baptiste Joseph, chevalier de Laumoy
 Tadeusz Kościuszko
 Ebenezer Learned
 Andrew Lewis
 Lachlan McIntosh
 George Mathews
 William Maxwell
 Hugh Mercer
 Samuel Meredith (October 1777 he was commissioned General of the 4th Brigade and took part in the Battles of Brandywine and Germantown.)
 James Moore (North Carolina Line 1st Brigade)
 Daniel Morgan
 William Moultrie
 Francis Nash (North Carolina Line NC Brigade)
 John Nixon
 Enoch Poor
 Philippe Hubert Preudhomme de Borre
 Kazimierz Pułaski (Casimir Pulaski)
Michael Kovats (Kováts Mihály)
 Rufus Putnam
 James Reed
 Matthias Alexis Roche de Fermoy
 William Thompson
 Charles Armand Tuffin, marquis de la Rouërie
 Charles Scott (brevet to Major General 1791)
 John Stark (not promoted to major general until 1786)
 Jethro Sumner (North Carolina Line 2nd Brigade)
 Jacobus Swartwout
 James Mitchell Varnum
 Anthony Wayne
 George Weedon
 James Wilkinson (brevet to brigadier in 1777, promoted to major general in 1812)
 Otho Holland Williams
 Frederick William, Baron de Woedtke
 William Woodford (died as POW)
 David Wooster participated in the Quebec invasion, serving as military governor of Montreal. He led the Canadian Department after the death of Richard Montgomery. Following the retreat from Quebec, he returned to his native Connecticut, where he led the state militia. He was killed in the 1777 Battle of Ridgefield.

Militia
 Connecticut 
 Gold Selleck Silliman
 Delaware
Thomas Collins led the Delaware militia following Rodney's resignation, and served as president of the state after the war.
 Caesar Rodney, signed the Declaration of Independence, and led the Delaware state militia until 1781, when he resigned due to poor health. He was active in suppressing Loyalist dissent, and raising men and provisions for the national effort.
 Georgia
 Samuel Elbert (Major General of the Georgia militia)
 James Gunn (Brigadier General in the Georgia militia and U.S Congressman)
 Maryland
 Thomas Johnson
 John Stricker
 Massachusetts
 Samuel McClellan
 Joseph Palmer
 Peleg Wadsworth
 John Fellows
 Timothy Danielson Lead the Hampshire County Militia, was a Brigadier General in the Massachusetts Militia throughout the Revolutionary War. 
 Jonathan Warner
 Joseph Warren an American physician who played a leading role in American Patriot organizations in Boston in the early days of the American Revolution, eventually serving as President of the revolutionary Massachusetts Provincial Congress. Warren enlisted Paul Revere and William Dawes on April 18, 1775, to leave Boston and spread the alarm that the British garrison in Boston was setting out to raid the town of Concord and arrest rebel leaders John Hancock and Samuel Adams. Warren participated in the next day's Battles of Lexington and Concord. Warren had been commissioned a Major General in the colony's militia shortly before the June 17, 1775 Battle of Bunker Hill. Rather than exercising his rank, Warren served in the battle as a private soldier, and was killed in combat when British troops stormed the redoubt atop Breed's Hill.
 New Hampshire
 Nathaniel Folsom
 William Whipple
 New Jersey
Philemon Dickinson (Major General of New Jersey Militia from 1777 to 1782)
 New York
 John Morin Scott
 Nicholas Herkimer
 North Carolina
 John Ashe (Brigadier General of the Wilmington District Brigade, Major General of North Carolina Militia and State Troops)
 William Bryan (Brigadier General of the New Bern District Brigade)
 John Butler (Brigaier General of the Hillsborough District Brigade
 Richard Caswell (Colonel of the New Bern District Minutemen and later Brigadier General of New Bern District Brigade)
 William Caswell (Brigadier General of the New Bern District Brigade)
 William Lee Davidson (Brigaier General Pro Tempore of Salisbury District Brigade)
 Thomas Eaton (Brigadier General of the Halifax District Brigade)
 Isaac Gregory (Brigadier General of the Edenton District Brigade)
 Henry William Harrington (Brigadier General Pro Tempore of the Salisbury District Brigade)
 Allen Jones (Brigadier General of Halifax District Brigade)
 James Kenan (Brigadier General Pro Tempore of the Wilmington District Brigade)
 Alexander Lillington (Brigadier General of Wilmington District Brigade)
 Matthew Locke (Brigadier General Pro Tempore of the Salisbury District Brigade)
 Alexander Mebane Brigadier General, Commissary General of the State of North Carolina
 Charles McDowell (Brigadier General of Morgan District Brigade)
 Thomas Person (Brigadier General of Hillsborough District Brigade)
 Andrew Pickens (Brigadier General Pro Tempore of Salisbury District Brigade)
 Ambrose Ramsey (Brigadier General Pro Tempore of the Salisbury District Brigade)
 Griffith Rutherford (Brigadier General of Salisbury District Brigade)
 William Skinner (Brigadier General of the Edenton District Brigade)
 William Smallwood (Major General of North Carolina Militia, also Continental officer)
 Edward Vaile (Brigadier General of Edenton District Brigade)
 Pennsylvania
 Daniel Brodhead
 Samuel Miles
 Rhode Island
 Joshua Babcock
 William West
 South Carolina
 John Barnwell, BG commander of the South Carolina 4th Brigade
 Stephen Bull, BG commander of the South Carolina 1st Brigade
 Francis Marion, BG commander of the South Carolina 2nd Brigade
 Alexander McIntosh, BG commander of the South Carolina 4th Brigade
 Andrew Pickens, BG commander of the South Carolina 3rd Brigade
 Richard Richardson, BG commander of the South Carolina 2nd Brigade
 Thomas Sumter, "The Gamecock," was the senior brigadier general appointed in South Carolina, but operated independently of the others. As a result, Sumter rarely commanded more than his own brigade of state troops and militia.
 Andrew Williamson, BG of the South Carolina 3rd Brigade
 Vermont
 Ethan Allen (Major General of the Vermont Republic Militia)
 Seth Warner
 Virginia
 George Rogers Clark, led Virginia militia on 1778-79 Illinois campaign, promoted to Brigadier General in 1781 by Governor Thomas Jefferson.
 Robert Lawson
 Joseph Martin (Brigadier General of Virginia Militia)
 Sampson Mathews, lieutenant colonel called on by Thomas Jefferson to resist Benedict Arnold's 1781 invasion of Virginia.

Continental Navy
 John Adams Famous Bostonian and Son of Liberty member, wrote the Navy's Code of Discipline. Additionally, through the Continental Congress commissioned the first war ships for defending the Colonies and seizing British resources from reaching enemy troops.
 John Barry was a Captain in the Continental Navy. During his time as a commander he oversaw the commands of four American warships. He is known, along with John Adams and John Paul Jones, as the "Father of the American Navy".
 John Hazelwood was a Commodore in the Pennsylvania and Continental Navies, active in the Philadelphia campaign and siege of Fort Mifflin.
 John Paul Jones was a captain in the Continental Navy and famously took captive  during the Battle of Flamborough Head after his ship, Bonhomme Richard, sank. He, along with John Barry, is known as "The Father of the American Navy".
 Esek Hopkins was an established Sea Captain and Brigadier General of Militia from Rhode Island who was named Commodore and Commander in Chief of the Continental Navy in 1776. He disregarded his instructions from Congress to take the fleet to cruise the Southern colonies, instead attacking British colonial holdings in the Caribbean in the Battle of Nassau. This act was Initially hailed as heroic, he was subsequently censured by Congress in August 1776, and was relieved of his command in January 1778.
 James Nicholson of Virginia was the designated Senior Captain in the Navy for political reasons in October 1776. He was the senior officer in the navy after Commodore Hopkins's relief in 1778, but never exercised command over the whole navy because it had ceased to operate as an organized fleet.
 Abraham Whipple was a Commodore in the Continental Navy. In one of the first military actions of the revolution in 1772, Whipple led 50 Rhode Islanders in the capture and burning of the British revenue cutter Gaspee.

Great Britain
At the head of the British forces was the King, George III. From 1772 to 1778 the office of Commander-in-Chief was vacant, but from 1778 to 1782 Sir Jeffery Amherst held the post, with the title of General on the Staff. He was succeeded in February 1782 by Henry Seymour Conway.

Next in importance to the Commander-in-Chief was the Secretary at War, who served as head of the War Office, and was bidden "to observe and follow such orders and directions as he should from time to time receive from the King or the general of the forces". Not until 1783 was he a minister responsible to parliament. At the start of part of the war the secretary was Lord Barrington. He was replaced in 1778 by Charles Jenkinson who held this position until the fall of Lord North's government.

Crown and Government officials
 King George III of Great Britain
 Frederick North, Lord North, Prime Minister (1770–1782)
 Charles Watson-Wentworth, 2nd Marquess of Rockingham, Prime Minister (1782, died in office)
 William Petty, 2nd Earl of Shelburne, Prime Minister (1782–1783)
 George Germain, Secretary of State for the Colonies (1775–1782)
 John Montagu, 4th Earl of Sandwich, First Lord of the Admiralty

Commander-in-Chief of the Forces
 Office vacant from 1772 to 1778
 Sir Jeffery Amherst (1778–1782)
 The Hon. Henry Seymour Conway (1782–1793)

Secretaries at War
 William Wildman Shute Barrington, 2nd Viscount Barrington
 Charles Jenkinson

Commander-in-Chief, North America

Until the war was widened into a global conflict by France's entry in 1778, the war's military activities were primarily directed by the Commander-in-Chief, North America.
 General Thomas Gage was commander-in-chief of North American forces from 1763 until 1775, and governor of the Province of Massachusetts Bay from 1774 to 1776. He presided over the rising tensions (with his actions sometimes contributing to them, in the opinions of some historians) that led to the outbreak of the war. He was recalled after the Battle of Bunker Hill.
 General William Howe replaced Gage, and personally directed the war effort in 1776 and 1777, including the British captures of New York City and Philadelphia. He failed to gain control over New Jersey, and his actions in taking Philadelphia contributed to the failure of John Burgoyne's Saratoga campaign. He resigned in early 1778.
 Sir Henry Clinton served as commander-in-chief from 1778 to 1782. He oversaw the British army's retreat from Philadelphia, and then directed the Siege of Charleston, the landing of a large body of troops early in the "Southern strategy". He directed most British activities afterward from his base in New York, and played a role in negotiating Benedict Arnold's change of allegiance. Following Cornwallis' surrender at Yorktown, he was replaced by Guy Carleton.
 Sir Guy Carleton was governor of Quebec from 1768 to 1777, overseeing the province's defense against the 1775 invasion, and its first counterattack. Denied command of what became John Burgoyne's campaign, he resigned in 1777. In 1782, King George appointed him to replace Clinton as commander-in-chief. He directed the withdrawal of British troops from the states, and helped to organize the relocation of thousands of Loyalists to other British territories.

Lieutenant and Major Generals
 Mariot Arbuthnot was Vice-Admiral of the Blue in the Royal Navy, and commanded its North American station from 1779 until 1781. He led the navy in the Siege of Charleston and the Battle of Cape Henry. He was also Lieutenant Governor of Nova Scotia from 1776 to 1778, active in suppressing Patriot sentiment in that province.
 Sir Robert Boyd was a lieutenant general who served in the garrison at the Great Siege of Gibraltar.
 John Burgoyne was a lieutenant general who led a British attempt to gain control of the Hudson River valley in 1777 that was stopped at Saratoga. Paroled to England and eventually exchanged, he did not serve further in the war.
 The Hon. John Byron was the admiral in command of the West Indies naval station in 1778 and 1779. He fought the minor Battle of Grenada against d'Estaing in 1779, and retired the following year.
 Archibald Campbell, while a lieutenant colonel, regained control of Georgia in 1779 and served as its royal governor. Promoted to major general, he served in Jamaica, becoming its governor in 1782.
 John Campbell served in the Boston campaign and the New York and New Jersey campaign early in the war, before being given command of the defense of West Florida. Captured in the 1781 Siege of Pensacola, he ended the war in the New York City garrison.
 Henry Clinton, was sent into Massachusetts along with William Howe and John Burgoyne to aid Thomas Gage. He was one of the men responsible for planning the Battle of Bunker Hill. He would later serve as Commander in Chief, America.
 Sir George Collier was the commander of the Royal Navy's North American station from 1776 to 1779, providing naval support to a variety of operations, and leading the relief of the 1779 Penobscot Expedition. Thereafter he served in European waters, where he participated in one of the relief convoys to Gibraltar.
 Sir Eyre Coote was the commander-in-chief of British forces in India. While not personally involved in combat against the French and Dutch there, troops that were part of his command were involved in engagements against French and Dutch targets, while he was preoccupied with the Second Anglo-Mysore War.
 Charles Cornwallis, 1st Marquess Cornwallis participated in many campaigns in North America. He served under Howe and Clinton in the New York and Philadelphia campaigns and was given control of the southern army by Clinton after the Siege of Charleston. At first successfully driving the Continentals from South Carolina, he was eventually forced to surrender his army at Yorktown in the last major engagement between American and British forces.
 Sir John Dalling, 1st Baronet was a general and governor of Jamaica until 1781, where he coordinated British military affairs throughout the Caribbean and the West Indies.
 William Dalrymple commanded British troops in Boston when 3-400 civilians provoked 8 soldiers into firing their muskets without orders, killing five. Patriots subsequently publicized it heavily as the "Boston Massacre". He served as quartermaster general of the British Army in North America from 1779 to 1783.
 Sir Charles Douglas was an admiral in the Royal Navy. He led the advance fleet that brought relief to Quebec in April 1776, and served under Rodney in the Battle of the Saintes.
 Sir William Erskine, 1st Baronet was a general who served under Howe and Clinton in the New York and Philadelphia campaigns. He also served for a time as quartermaster general before leaving active service in 1779.
 Sir William Fawcett became the army's adjutant general in 1781. His most important role in the war was overseeing the embarkation of hired German troops for deployment to the various theaters of war.
 The Hon. Simon Fraser of Lovat was a general and colonel of the 71st (Highland) Regiment of Foot. While he did not serve in the war, he was responsible for raising the regiment, which saw service throughout much of North America, and was captured at Yorktown.
 Samuel Graves was the admiral in charge of the navy's North American station at the outbreak of the war. He directed naval activities for much of the Siege of Boston, and gave orders resulting in the politically and literally inflammatory Burning of Falmouth in October 1775. He was recalled in January 1776, and saw no more service in the war.
 Thomas Graves, 1st Baron Graves was an admiral and the nephew of Samuel Graves. As a lieutenant, he participated in the Battle of Chelsea Creek in 1775. By 1781 he had risen to become commander of the North American station. His fleet was driven off in the critical Battle of the Chesapeake that enabled the French blockade of Yorktown.
 Sir William Green was a general. He was the chief engineer during the Great Siege of Gibraltar, and had risen to major general by the end of the siege, later full general.
 Charles Grey, 1st Earl Grey was one of the more successful army leaders. He led a brigade at the Battle of Brandywine, led forces in the Battle of Paoli and in raids on New Bedford and Martha's Vineyard, Massachusetts.
 Frederick Haldimand was responsible for the British troops in the Siege of Boston, although his authority was often superseded by Thomas Gage, who had overall command. Haldimand served as governor of Quebec from 1778 to 1786, with responsibility for the defense of the province and the organization and support of frontier attacks in the Ohio Country.
 Samuel Hood, 1st Viscount Hood was an admiral, who served primarily under Rodney in the West Indies. He was also present at the Battle of the Chesapeake under Thomas Graves.
 Richard Howe, 1st Earl Howe was chief of the North American naval station from 1776 to 1778, and brother of Sir William Howe. He was given diplomatic authority by King George to conduct negotiations at the unsuccessful Staten Island Peace Conference with John Adams, Benjamin Franklin and Edward Rutledge. Sympathetic to the colonists' cause, he saw no further service until 1782, when he participated in the relief of Gibraltar.
 William Howe Before taking over as the Commander in chief, North America, Howe, along with Henry Clinton were sent into Massachusetts to serve with then Commander in chief, North America Thomas Gage. Howe was the main person in charge of the British forces in the Battle of Bunker Hill.
 The Hon. Alexander Leslie served under Cornwallis in the southern campaigns, but was commanding forces in Charleston at the time of Cornwallis' surrender at Yorktown.
 William Medows distinguished himself in the Philadelphia campaign and the Battle of St. Lucia in 1778. He was then despatched to India, where he was primarily involved in the Second Anglo-Mysore War.
 Hector Munro, 8th of Novar was a general active in India. He led the forces that captured Pondicherry in 1778, and led forces against the Mysoreans.
 William Phillips was an artillery general. He served under Burgoyne and was captured at Saratoga in 1777. Exchanged in 1780, he took over leadership of Benedict Arnold's army in Virginia, before becoming ill and dying.
 William Picton was a major general who served in the Gibraltar garrison during the siege.
 George Brydges Rodney, 1st Baron Rodney was the commander of the naval station in the West Indies. He also participated in one of the expeditions to relieve Gibraltar, and, after capturing de Grasse in the Battle of the Saintes, famously wrote, "Within two little years I have taken two Spanish, one French and one Dutch admirals."
 Francis Smith. As a Major General, he oversaw the expedition of Concord to find weapons that were being smuggled by rebels. The British troops were halted by rebels on the way in Lexington, causing a skirmish to break out. The first battle of the war.

Brigadier generals
 James Agnew
 Benedict Arnold was a leading force for the Continental Army in the early days of the war, changed sides and fled to join the British, for whom he served until the end of 1781 as a brigadier general.
 Oliver De Lancey Sr.
 Simon Fraser of Balnain
 George Garth
 Sir John Johnson, 2nd Baronet
 Augustine Prévost
 Francis Rawdon-Hastings, 1st Marquess of Hastings

Other notable officers

 Lieutenant Colonel James Abercrombie, while leading the retreat at the Battle of Bunker Hill, he was fatally injured in the thigh from being shot by a rebel. 
 Lieutenant Colonel John Graves Simcoe, he was a Captain who traveled across the Northeast to look for American spies. He was featured in the AMC Series Turn: Washington's Spies, as one of the main antagonists.
 Lieutenant Colonel Banastre Tarleton, a young cavalry officer who led the British Legion, a regiment of American loyalist cavalry and light infantry that was nicknamed “Tarleton’s Legion” and the “Green Dragoons”. Tarleton gained infamy during the southern campaign when his men massacred surrendering Continental soldiers at the Battle of Waxhaws, which resulted in him being nicknamed “The Butcher” and “Bloody Ban”.
 Major John Andre was an officer in charge of British spies and Tories across the 13 Colonies, working under General Clinton.
 Major John Pitcairn physically led the British forces in the expedition of Concord, in which it was speculated that rebels were hiding weapons. He died soon after The Battle of Bunker Hill after sustaining 6 gunshot wounds, including one to the head.
 Captain Thomas Preston, a couple of years before the war broke out, Preston was in charge of the eight-man squad that shot five angered American colonists during the controversial Boston Massacre.

Royal governors
 Montfort Browne
 Henry Hamilton
 John Murray, 4th Earl of Dunmore

Frontier leaders
 Patrick Sinclair
 John Butler
 William Caldwell
 Simon Girty
 Robert Rogers

Native Americans

The following Native American leaders from various nations took part in the American Revolution:

Chickamauga Cherokee
 Dragging Canoe

Lenape
 Buckongahelas
 Captain Pipe
 White Eyes
 Gelelemend 

Miami
 Little Turtle

Mohawk people
 Joseph Brant
 John Deseronto
 Joseph Louis Cook

Ojibwe
 Matchekewis

Odawa
 Egushawa

Seneca people
 Cornplanter
 Guyasuta
 Little Beard
 Red Jacket
 Sayenqueraghta

Cayuga people
 Fish Carrier

Shawnee people
 Blue Jacket
 Black Fish
 Black Hoof
 Black Snake 
 Cornstalk 
 Moluntha

Sioux
 Wapasha

Wyandot people
 Dunquat

German principalities
Great Britain hired the services of military troops from a number of German dominions of the Holy Roman Empire. The largest number arrived in 1776 pursuant to agreements signed in late 1775 or early 1776, but additional forces were recruited in 1778, with only limited success. The single largest contingent came from Hesse-Kassel, hence the term "Hessians".
 Anhalt-Zerbst: Colonel Johann von Rauschenplatt commanded the single regiment from Anhalt-Zerbst.
 Ansbach-Bayreuth: Colonel Friedrich Ludwig Albrecht von Eyb commanded a regiment of Ansbach infantry, and led the brigade consisting of his regiment and one from Bayreuth that included an artillery company, until May 1778.
 Ansbach-Bayreuth: Colonel Friedrich August Valentin Voit von Salzburg commanded the Ansbach brigade after Eyb's departure.
 Braunschweig-Lüneburg (Brunswick): Major General Friedrich Adolf Riedesel commanded the Brunswick troops in North America. As part of John Burgoyne's army, they were surrendered at the end of the failed Saratoga campaign. Riedesel was released to Quebec in 1781, where he served in that province's defense until his return to Europe in 1784.
 Electorate of Hanover: Lieutenant General August de la Motte commanded three regiments of Hanoverian troops that King George III, in his capacity as Elector of Hanover, ordered to Gibraltar, where they participated in the Great Siege of Gibraltar.
 Electorate of Hanover: Colonel Carl Ludwig Reinbold commanded two regiments of Hanoverian troops that King George III, in his capacity as Elector of Hanover, ordered to India, where they participated in the Siege of Cuddalore under Hector Munro.
 Electorate of Hanover: Major General Heinrich Bernhard von Sydow commanded two regiments of Hanoverian troops that King George III, in his capacity as Elector of Hanover, ordered to Minorca.
 Hesse-Kassel: Lieutenant General Leopold Philip von Heister was the first leader of the Hessian troops, and was active in the New York campaign in 1776. Differences with British General William Howe led him to depart after the disastrous Battle of Trenton.
 Hesse-Kassel: Lieutenant General Wilhelm von Knyphausen replaced von Heister, and continued to lead the Hessian forces under Howe, and later Sir Henry Clinton, in the Philadelphia campaign. While being senior to all British generals beside the C-I-C he was not listed as a possible replacement for him. He left due to poor health in 1782.
 Hesse-Kassel: Friedrich Wilhelm von Lossberg succeeded Knyphausen as commander of the Hessians until their departure at the end of the war.
 Hesse-Hanau: Wilhelm von Gall commanded the infantry regiment provided by Hesse-Hanau. He served under Riedesel in the Saratoga campaign, spending most of the war as a prisoner after Burgoyne's surrender.
 Hesse-Hanau: Georg Pausch commanded the Hesse-Hanau artillery. In the Battle of Valcour Island the Hesse-Hanau artillery participated with two gunboats. In 1777 he served under General John Burgoyne in the Saratoga campaign and became a prisoner after Burgoyne's surrender.
 Waldeck: Johann von Hanxleden was a colonel who led the single regiment that Waldeck provided. Under his command, the regiment served in Howe's army in New York and New Jersey until 1778, when it was transferred to West Florida. He was killed in a failed attack on Mobile in 1781.
 Waldeck: Albrecht von Horn was the lieutenant colonel of the Waldeck regiment, who assumed command after Hanxleden's death. After the fall of Pensacola, the Waldeck regiment's remnants were paroled to New York.

France

Civilian leaders
 King Louis XVI, the absolute ruler of France, ascended to the throne in 1774. He acted as his own head of government, but depended on a circle of official and unofficial advisors for advice and support. He formally directed France's overall war effort.
 Charles Gravier, comte de Vergennes was the French foreign minister, and one of King Louis' closest advisors. He was instrumental in bringing both France and Spain into the war.
 Antoine de Sartine was France's naval minister from 1774 to 1780. Before the war he took important steps to reorganize the French navy, giving port and fleet commanders more power.
 Charles Eugène Gabriel de La Croix, marquis de Castries replaced Sartine as naval minister.
 Louis Jean Marie de Bourbon, Duke of Penthièvre was the admiral of the fleet, a largely ceremonial post usually held by a noble. Penthièvre was a lieutenant general, but had no naval experience.
 Claude Louis, Comte de Saint-Germain was France's war minister from 1775 to 1777.
 Alexandre Marie Léonor de Saint-Mauris de Montbarrey was France's war minister from 1778 to 1780.
 Philippe Henri, marquis de Ségur was France's war minister from 1780 to 1787.

Generals
 Charles Joseph Patissier, Marquis de Bussy-Castelnau was a French general. He served for many years in India, and led French ground troops there in the later stages of the war.
 François-Jean de Beauvoir, Chevalier de Chastellux was a major general who served under Rochambeau in North America.
 Claude Gabriel, marquis de Choisy was a brigadier general who served under Rochambeau at Yorktown. For his leadership there, he was promoted to major general (Maréchal de camp).
 Charles René Dominique Sochet, Chevalier Destouches was an admiral, who served on the North American station. As commander of the Newport fleet, he fought the 1781 Battle of Cape Henry.
 Charles Hector, comte d'Estaing was a vice-admiral in the French Navy. Active off the North American coast, he failed to support the land forces in the Battle of Rhode Island, and led French forces in the failed Siege of Savannah. He was also active in the West Indies, participating in a number of engagements there.
 François Joseph Paul de Grasse, Comte de Grasse was a rear admiral of the French Navy, active in the West Indies. His fleet brought French troops to Virginia prior to the siege of Yorktown, then drew off the fleet of Thomas Graves in the Battle of the Chesapeake before providing the naval blockade of Yorktown that trapped Cornwallis in 1781. He was defeated and captured in the Battle of the Saintes in 1782.
 Luc Urbain de Bouexic, comte de Guichen was Lieutenant Général des Armées Navales (roughly equivalent to Vice-Admiral) in the French Navy. He was most active in the West Indies, but also saw action in the naval blockade of Gibraltar.
 Armand Louis de Gontaut, Duc de Lauzun was briefly the commander of French army forces in North America following Rochambeau's departure in 1783. Lauzun's brigade led the French march from Rhode Island to Virginia in 1781.
 Toussaint-Guillaume Picquet de la Motte was an admiral who served in the West Indies under d'Estaing and Guichen. His most famous feat was capturing many ships of a convoy that Admiral Rodney had sent toward England bearing loot captured after taking St. Eustatius in 1781.
 Thomas d'Orves was an admiral who served in the Indian Ocean. Already older when the war began, he avoided conflict with Admiral Hughes in 1779, and died in 1782 while en route from Isle de France (now Mauritius) to India with the fleet Suffren took over.
 Jean-Baptiste Donatien de Vimeur, comte de Rochambeau was the commander of French army forces in North America for most of the French participation in the war. Arriving in 1779, they were largely inactive due to the successful British blockading of Rhode Island's ports. In 1781 Rochambeau led the French forces south to participate in the siege of Yorktown, and then remained to garrison southern states until 1783.
 Pierre André de Suffren de Saint Tropez, the Bailli de Suffren, after serving under d'Estaing in the West Indies, led a French fleet from France to India in 1781, and engaged five times with Admiral Edward Hughes in an evenly-matched contest for control of Indian waters in 1782 and 1783.
 Charles du Houx de Vioménil was a major general. He served as Rochambeau's second in command during the French Army's time in North America.
 Charles-Joseph-Hyacinth du Houx, Vicomte de Vioménil was a major general, and brother to Antoine-Charles. He also served under Rochambeau.
 Claude-Anne-Montbleru, Marquis de St. Simon was a major general serving in the West Indies when France entered the war. His troops sailed north with de Grasse and were present at Yorktown.
 Jacques-Melchior Saint-Laurent, Comte de Barras was an admiral in the French navy. He served under d'Estaing at the Battle of Rhode Island, and under de Grasse in the West Indies in 1782. His decision to remain in Newport in disobedience to orders enabled him to deliver the French siege train to Yorktown.
 François Aymar de Monteil was an admiral. He assisted the Spanish during the siege of Pensacola, and then served under de Grasse during the 1782 campaign.
 Charles-Henri-Louis d'Arsac, Chevalier de Ternay was a rear admiral who commanded the naval forces of the Expédition Particulière (Special Expedition) that delivered Rochambeau's army to Newport, Rhode Island; he died aboard ship in Newport Harbor in 1780.

Spain

 Antonio Barceló was the Spanish vice-admiral responsible for the blockade of Gibraltar during its siege.
 Juan Manuel Cagigal y Monserrat was an admiral in the Spanish Navy, who provided timely reinforcements to the Spanish forces at Pensacola.
 Luis de Córdova y Córdova was an admiral in the Spanish Navy active primarily in European waters. He captured several British supply convoys but was unsuccessful in preventing a British resupply of Gibraltar following the 1782 Battle of Cape Spartel.
 Louis des Balbes de Berton de Crillon, 1st Duke of Mahón was a Frenchman who served as a general in the Spanish Army. He led Spanish forces during the Great Siege of Gibraltar and conducted the successful Franco-Spanish invasion of Minorca.
 Bernardo de Gálvez was the governor of Spanish Louisiana, and a general of the Spanish Army. He successfully drove the British military entirely from West Florida from 1779 to 1781, securing much the southern frontier of the United States against British attack. He also led Spanish forces in the seizure of Nassau in The Bahamas in 1782.
 Matías de Gálvez y Gallardo was a Spanish general and Captain General of Spanish Guatemala, which included territory that is now Honduras and Nicaragua. He was active in fighting British attempts to gain significant footholds in Central America, successfully driving most British influence from the Mosquito Coast and the island of Roatán with little assistance beyond the Spanish colonies.
 Juan de Lángara was an admiral in the Spanish Navy. He participated in the Armada of 1779 and was captured by the British in the Moonlight Battle of January 1780.
 Bonaventura Moreno was a Spanish rear admiral. He oversaw the blockade of Minorca during the 1781 invasion and commanded the floating batteries at the siege of Gibraltar.
 Jose Solano y Bote was an admiral in the Spanish Navy. For his role in assisting Bernardo de Gálvez in the capture of Pensacola, he was promoted to vice-admiral.
 Martín Álvarez de Sotomayor was a lieutenant general in the Spanish Army. He led the siege of Gibraltar until the arrival of the Duc de Crillon in 1782.

Dutch Republic

The Dutch Republic played a significant economic role in the war, but its military participation was limited, in part due to internal political divisions.
 Johan Zoutman was an admiral in the Dutch Navy. The navy's activities were largely ineffective, as many ships were blockaded in their home ports or captured when some of their colonial outposts were taken. Zoutman led the only notable attempt to break a convoy out of Dutch ports; he was thwarted by the British in the Battle of Dogger Bank.
 Jan Hendrik van Kinsbergen was lieutenant-admiral in the Dutch Navy. He fought in the Battle of Dogger Bank, in which the Dutch claimed victory, and was highly acclaimed by the Dutch as a naval hero.
 Reynier van Vlissingen was the governor of Negapatam, the principal outpost of the Dutch East India Company in India. He directed the unsuccessful defense of Negapatam against a British-led siege in 1781.
 Iman Willem Falck was the governor of Trincomalee, the principal outpost of the Dutch East India Company on the island of Ceylon. He directed the unsuccessful defense of that port against a British amphibious assault.
 Carel Hendrik Ver Huell was a third lieutenant in the Dutch navy. He participated in the "Affair of Fielding and Bylandt", of 30 December 1779, during which a Dutch convoy, escorted by a squadron under Admiral Bylandt, was attacked in peace time by a British squadron under Commodore Charles Fielding, and also fought in the Battle of Dogger Bank (1781), where he distinguished himself.

References

Notes

Cited literature
 Adams, James Truslow. (1934). "Montgomery, Richard." In: Dictionary of American Biography. American Council of Learned Societies, vol. 13, pp. 98–99. 
 Adams, Randolph G. (1930). "Conway, Thomas." In: Dictionary of American Biography. American Council of Learned Societies, vol. 3, pp. 365–366.
 Adams, Randolph G. (1931). "Gates, Horatio." In: Dictionary of American Biography. American Council of Learned Societies, vol. 7, pp. 184–188.
 Adams, Randolph G. (1933). "Lee, Charles." In: Dictionary of American Biography. American Council of Learned Societies, vol. 11, pp. 98–101.
 Alden, Edmund Kimball (1928). "Alexander, William." In: Dictionary of American Biography. American Council of Learned Societies, vol. 1, pp. 175–176.
 Alden, Edmund Kimball (1928). "Armstrong, John." In: Dictionary of American Biography. American Council of Learned Societies, vol. 1, pp. 353–354. [cited as Kimball 1928a]
 Anonymous (1847). Washington And The Generals Of The American Revolution. 
 Barnes, Viola F. (1931). "Glover, John." In: Dictionary of American Biography. American Council of Learned Societies, vol. 7, pp. 331–332.
 Broadwater, Robert P. (2012).  American Generals of the Revolutionary War. McFarland & Company.
 Chernow, Ron (2011). Washington. Penguin Books.
 Clark, Jane (1934). "Parsons, Samuel Holden." In: Dictionary of American Biography. American Council of Learned Societies, vol. 14, pp. 270–271.
 Coburn, Frederick W. (1936). "Varnum, James Mitchell." In: Dictionary of American Biography. American Council of Learned Societies, vol. 19, pp. 227–228.
 Curtis, Edward E. (1933). "Larned, Ebenezer." In: Dictionary of American Biography. American Council of Learned Societies, vol. 11, pp. 77–78.
 Curtis, Edward E. (1934). "Nixon, John." In: Dictionary of American Biography. American Council of Learned Societies, vol. 13, p. 530.
 Ferreiro, Larrie D. (2016). Brothers at Arms. New York.
 Fitzpatrick, John C. (1936). "Washington, George." In: Dictionary of American Biography. American Council of Learned Societies, vol. 19, pp. 509–527.
 Fredriksen, John C. (2006). Revolutionary War Almanac. Facts on File.
 Heitman, Francis B. (1914). Historical Register of Officers of the Continental Army. Washington, D.C.
 Hannings, Bud (2008). Chronology of the American Revolution. McFarland & Company.
 Hubbard, Robert E. (2017). Major General Israel Putnam. McFarland & Company.
 Kapp, Friedrich (1862). Leben des amerikanischen Generals Johann Kalb. Stuttgart.
 Kohn, George C. (2008). Encyclopedia of Plague and Pestilence. New York.
 Krout John A. (1935). "Schuyler, Philip John." In: Dictionary of American Biography. American Council of Learned Societies, vol. 16, pp. 477–480. 
 Lefkowitz, Arthur S. (2020). Colonel Hamilton and Colonel Burr. Stackpole Books.
 Lockhart, Paul (2008). The Drillmaster of Valley Forge. New York.
 Meriwether Robert L. (1931). "Gadsen, Christopher." In: Dictionary of American Biography. American Council of Learned Societies, vol. 7, pp. 82–83.
 Metcalf, Bryce (1938). Original Members and Other Officers Eligible to the Society of the Cincinnati, 1783-1938: With the Institution, Rules of Admission, and Lists of the Officers of the General and State Societies. Strasburg, VA: Shenandoah Publishing House, Inc.
 Monaghan, Frank (1933). "Kalb, Johann." In: Dictionary of American Biography. American Council of Learned Societies, vol. 10, pp. 253–254. [Cited as Monaghan 1933a]
 Monaghan, Frank (1933). "Lafayette, Marie Joseph Paul Yves Roch Gilbert du Motier." In: Dictionary of American Biography. American Council of Learned Societies, vol. 10, pp. 535–539.
 Monaghan, Frank (1935). "Pulaski, Casimir." In: Dictionary of American Biography. American Council of Learned Societies, vol. 15, pp. 259–260.
 Moody, Robert E. (1931). "Frye, Joseph." In: Dictionary of American Biography. American Council of Learned Societies, vol. 7, pp. 50–51. 
 Pierpaoli, Paul G. (2018). "Maxweell, William (ca. 1733-1796)" In: American Revolution: The Definitive Encyclopedia and Document Collection. ABC-CLIO, vol. 3, p. 948-949.
 Peeling, James H. (1933). "Mifflin, Thomas." In: Dictionary of American Biography. American Council of Learned Societies, vol. 12, pp. 606–608.
 Nelson, Paul David (2018). "Lewis, Andrew (1720-1781)." In: American Revolution: The Definitive Encyclopedia and Document Collection. ABC-CLIO, vol. 3, p. 866.
 Robinson, William A. (1933). "Lincoln, Benjamin." In: Dictionary of American Biography. American Council of Learned Societies, vol. 11, pp. 259–262.
 Rossie, Jonathan Gregory (1975). The Politics of Command in the American Revolution. Syracuse University Press.
 Shelton, Hal (1994). General Richard Montgomery and the American Revolution. New York University Press.
 Straubel, Rolf (2012). "Er möchte nur wißen, daß die Armée mir gehöret." Friedrich II. und seine Offiziere. Berliner Wissenschafts-Verlag.
 Taafe, Stephen R. (2019). Washington's Revolutionary War Generals. University of Oklahoma Press.
 Tarbox, Increase N. (1876). Life of Israel Putnam. Boston.
 Thomas, William Sturgis (1929). Members of the Society of the Cincinnati, Original, Hereditary and Honorary; With a Brief Account of the Society's History and Aims. New York: T.A. Wright
 Tucker, Spencer C. (2018). "Coudray, Philippe-Charles-Jean-Baptiste Tronson du." In: American Revolution: The Definitive Encyclopedia and Document Collection. ABC-CLIO, vol. 1, p. 272.
 United States Congress (1961). Biographical Directory of the American Congress, 1774-1961. Washington, D.C.

Literature
 Black, Jeremy. War for America: The Fight for Independence, 1775–1783. St. Martin's Press (New York) and Sutton Publishing (UK), 1991.  (1991),  (1994 paperback),  (2001 paperpack).
 Boatner, Mark Mayo, III. Encyclopedia of the American Revolution. New York: McKay, 1966; revised 1974. .

Further reading
 Anderson, Troyer Steele. The Command of the Howe Brothers During the American Revolution. New York and London, 1936.
 Buchanan, John. The Road to Valley Forge: How Washington Built the Army That Won the Revolution. Wiley, 2004. .
 Fischer, David Hackett. Washington's Crossing. New York: Oxford University Press, 2004. . Winner of the 2005 Pulitzer Prize for History.
 Lengel, Edward G. General George Washington: A Military Life. New York: Random House, 2005. .
 McCullough, David. 1776. New York: Simon & Schuster, 2005. .
 de Wetter, Mardee. Incognito. An Affair of Honor. Las Cruces: Yucca Tree Press, 2006. .

External links
 The Society of the Cincinnati
 The American Revolution Institute

Military personnel of the American Revolutionary War
American Revolutionary War
Generals in the American Revolution